Bob Willson (born 1928) was a host of programs on CBC Television in Winnipeg and Toronto.

His broadcasting career started at the age of 18 at CFGP Grande Prairie, Alberta.

In 1947 he moved to CKUA Edmonton.

He started with CBC in 1949 at CBW Winnipeg, and was part of the on-air staff reporting on the Winnipeg Flood of 1950.

When CBWT started broadcasting in May 1954, he co-hosted the current affairs interview program Spotlight with Bruce Marsh.

In April, 1959, Bob moved to Toronto where he hosted a teen program on CBLT, Talk of the Town.

He was the Executive Producer for radio coverage of the 1988 Olympics for CBC.

References

"Winnipeg Favorite Is Popular In Toronto", Winnipeg Free Press - TV-Radio, November 26, 1960, p. 16

1928 births
Living people
Canadian television hosts